The Chicoasén Dam (officially known as Manuel Moreno Torres) is an embankment dam and hydroelectric power station on the Grijalva River near Chicoasén in Chiapas, Mexico. The dam's power plant, officially named for Manuel Moreno Torres,  contains 5 x 300 MW, 3 x 310 MW Francis turbine-generators. Torres was Comisión Federal de Electricidad's (the dam's owner) Director General in the later 1950s.  The original generators were first operational in 1980 while the 310 MW units were ordered in 2000 and operational by 2005. Since then, the hydroelectric power station is the largest in Mexico. The dam was designed in the early 1970s and constructed between 1974 and 1980 under topographical and geological constraints. It is an earth and rock fill embankment type with a height of 
It withholds a reservoir of 
and lies at the head of a  catchment area. It is the tallest dam in North America.

References

Dams in Mexico
Hydroelectric power stations in Mexico
Embankment dams
Dams completed in 1980
Dams on the Grijalva River